Youth on the March is an American religious television program originally broadcast on ABC from October 1949 to May 1952, and by the DuMont Television Network from October 1952 to June 1953. The show was presented by the Young People's Church of the Air, and included religious songs and instruction for children and teens.

Broadcast history
The series was aired “by most of [ABC’s] eleven affiliates”. In each episode, Percy Crawford, his wife Ruth, and their five children appeared. The series was broadcast live from Philadelphia's WFIL.

When Youth on the March was cancelled by ABC in 1952, the series was picked up by the DuMont Television Network for a one-season run, from October 5, 1952, to June 7, 1953. The series continued to air in first-run syndication over a handful of stations until 1958.

See also
List of programs broadcast by the DuMont Television Network
List of surviving DuMont Television Network broadcasts

References

Bibliography
David Weinstein, The Forgotten Network: DuMont and the Birth of American Television (Philadelphia: Temple University Press, 2004) 
Alex McNeil, Total Television, Fourth edition (New York: Penguin Books, 1980) 
Tim Brooks and Earle Marsh, The Complete Directory to Prime Time Network TV Shows, Third edition (New York: Ballantine Books, 1964)

External links

DuMont historical website
Percy & Ruth Crawford and the Birth of Televangelism

1949 American television series debuts
1958 American television series endings
American Broadcasting Company original programming
Black-and-white American television shows
DuMont Television Network original programming
English-language television shows
American religious television series